Kawtar Boulaid (born 10 October 1989) is a Moroccan long distance runner who specialises in the marathon. She competed in the women's marathon event at the 2016 Summer Olympics.

References

External links
 

1989 births
Living people
Moroccan female long-distance runners
Moroccan female marathon runners
Place of birth missing (living people)
Athletes (track and field) at the 2016 Summer Olympics
Olympic athletes of Morocco